Levonte "Kermit" Whitfield (born October 8, 1993) is an American football wide receiver and return specialist who is a free agent. He played college football for the Florida State Seminoles.

College career
As a freshman in 2013, he led all NCAA major college players with an average of 36.4 yards per kickoff return. Against the #2 Auburn Tigers in the 2014 BCS National Championship Game, with the Seminoles trailing 24-20, Whitfield returned a kickoff from Cody Parkey 100 yards for a go-ahead touchdown in the fourth quarter. His 36.4 yard average broke the Atlantic Coast Conference record and was the seventh best average in NCAA major college history. Through the first nine games of the 2015 season, Whitfield had caught 40 passes for 482 yards. He caught nine passes for 172 yards against Louisville on October 17, 2015.

Professional career

Chicago Bears
Whitfield signed with the Chicago Bears as an undrafted free agent on May 11, 2017. On May 14, 2017, he was waived by the Bears.

Cincinnati Bengals
On July 29, 2017, Whitfield signed with the Cincinnati Bengals. He was waived on September 2, 2017 and was signed to the Bengals' practice squad the next day. He signed a reserve/future contract with the Bengals on January 1, 2018.

On September 1, 2018, Whitfield was waived by the Bengals and was signed to the practice squad the next day. He signed a reserve/future contract with the Bengals on December 31, 2018. He was waived on July 25, 2019.

Los Angeles Wildcats
In October 2019, Whitfield was selected by the Los Angeles Wildcats during the open phase of the 2020 XFL Draft. He was waived on March 4, 2020.

Dallas Renegades
Whitfield signed with the Dallas Renegades on March 9, 2020. He had his contract terminated when the league suspended operations on April 10, 2020.

Saskatchewan Roughriders
Whitfield signed with the Saskatchewan Roughriders of the CFL on February 18, 2021. He was released on July 20, 2021.

See also
 List of NCAA major college yearly punt and kickoff return leaders

References

External links
Florida State Seminoles bio

1993 births
Living people
Players of American football from Orlando, Florida
American football wide receivers
Florida State Seminoles football players
Chicago Bears players
Cincinnati Bengals players
Los Angeles Wildcats (XFL) players
Dallas Renegades players
Saskatchewan Roughriders players